Elections to the House of Representatives were held in South Vietnam on 29 August 1971. Only a few candidates were affiliated with political parties. They were the final elections held in South Vietnam, as its government was overthrown by the North in 1975 and unified with the North in 1976.

Electoral system
In order to elect members of the House of Representatives, each province and city acted as an electoral district, except the city of Saigon, which was divided into three districts, and the province of Gia Dinh, which was divided into two districts. Voters had as many votes as there were seats to be filled. In single-member districts, this made the electoral system single-member plurality: in districts where there were more than one seat to be filled, this became the multiple non-transferable vote system.

Results
Voter turnout was 78.5%, with 5,567,446 of the 7,085,943 registered voters voting.

Elected members by province

As voters in districts that elected more than one member had more than one vote, percentages may not add up to 100%.

References

South Vietnam
Elections in South Vietnam
Parliamentary election
Election and referendum articles with incomplete results